Ron Nagorcka (born 1948) is an Australian composer, didjeridu and keyboard player. Nagorcka has been an important figure in the Australian experimental music scene for some 40 years.

Since 1988 he has been living in Tasmania. Based out of Tasmania, he has been creating a large body of works for sampled bird and animal sounds, conventional instruments, and didjeridu, in large part using complex just intonation systems.

References

Biography of Ron Nagorcka at the Australian Music Centre
John Jenkins, "Ron Nagorcka", Twenty-two Contemporary Australian Composers, Chapter 17, NMA Publications, Melbourne, 1988.

External links 
Ron Nagorcka's website

Australian male composers
Australian composers
1948 births
Living people